Montenero Val Cocchiara is a town and comune in the Province of Isernia, in the Molise region (southern Italy).

References

Cities and towns in Molise